Ville Valtteri Kantee (born 8 December 1978) is a Finnish former ski jumper who competed at World Cup level from 1996 to 2002.

Career
Kantee won two team (large and normal hill) silver medals at the 2001 FIS Nordic World Ski Championships in Lahti, as well as finishing ninth in the individual large hill event at those same championships. He also finished 23rd in the 2000 Ski Flying World Championships. At World Cup level he won two individual events, both on large hills, in Kuopio (28 November 1999) and Willingen (3 February 2001). His best overall finish was sixth in the 1999/00 season. Kantee retired in 2004 after spending his final seasons in the Continental Cup.

World Cup

Standings

Wins

References

1978 births
Living people
People from Lappeenranta
Finnish male ski jumpers
FIS Nordic World Ski Championships medalists in ski jumping
Sportspeople from South Karelia